Frederick II of Isenburg-Covern (German: Friedrich II. von Isenburg-Covern) was the Count of Isenburg-Covern from 1272 until 1277.

1277 deaths
House of Isenburg
Year of birth unknown